is a Japanese anime television series produced at TMS Entertainment, directed by Eiji Suganuma, and written by Takahiro Ōkura and Shigeru Murakoshi. Part of the Lupin III franchise, it is the seventh anime television adaptation of the Lupin III manga series created by Monkey Punch. The series aired from October 2021 to March 2022 on Nippon TV.

Premise
The first half of the series features gentleman thief Lupin III contending with detective Sherlock Holmes when Lupin becomes the top suspect in the murder of the former's longtime partner, Dr. Watson. Lupin is also after a treasure hidden by The Raven, a mysterious organization that manipulates the British government from the shadows. The second half revolves around Lupin's search for the mysterious woman Tomoe, whom Lupin believes to be his mother. Along the way, Lupin encounters other disciples of Tomoe, and begins to piece together forgotten memories of his past.

Voice cast

Production

Lupin the Third Part 6 is produced at TMS Entertainment and directed by Eiji Suganuma, who previously directed the Lupin TV special Prisoner of the Past in 2019. It is written by Takahiro Ōkura with character design by Hirotaka Marufuji. The series features scripts from guest writers like Mamoru Oshii, Masaki Tsuji, Taku Ashibe, Kanae Minato, and Akio Higuchi. The series was announced by TMS on May 26, 2021, and aired with an episode 0 from October 10, 2021 to March 27, 2022 on Nippon TV and other NNS networks, in conjunction with the 50th anniversary celebration of the anime, with Part I having premiered on October 24, 1971. On August 20, 2021, Sentai Filmworks licensed the series for home video and streaming on Hidive. The series began airing on Adult Swim's Toonami programming block in the United States starting on April 17, 2022, with the same dubbed episodes releasing weekly on Hidive starting on April 18, 2022. In Japan, the first twelve episodes were released in a Blu-ray box set on October 26, 2021. On January 7, 2022, it was announced that Shigeru Murakoshi would take over as series composition for Part 6, beginning with episode 13.

Notes

References

External links
  
 

2021 anime television series debuts
Part 6
Nippon TV original programming
Sentai Filmworks
Sherlock Holmes television series
TMS Entertainment
Television shows set in England
Toonami